Music writer may refer to:

 A Composer
 A Songwriter
 A Lyricist
 A Music copyist (a specialized calligrapher)
 A Music critic
 A writer who deals with music